Errera may refer to:

People
 Alberto Errera (1913–1944), Greek-Jewish officer and member of the anti-Nazi resistance
 Alfred Errera (1886–1960), Belgian mathematician
 Emilia Errera (1866–1901), Italian teacher and writer
 Gérard Errera (born 1943), French diplomat
 Isabelle Errera, née Goldschmidt (1869–1929), Belgian art historian specializing in textiles
 Jacques Errera (1896–1977), Belgian physicochemist
 Léo Errera (1858–1905), Belgian botanist
 Nicolas Errèra (1967), French musician and composer
 Rosa Errera (1864–1946), Italian writer, translator, and teacher

Toponyms
 Cape Errera, cape which forms the southwest end of Wiencke Island, in the Palmer Archipelago
 Errera Channel, channel between Rongé Island and the west coast of Graham Land

Other
 Errera graph, in the mathematical field of graph theory, graph discovered by Alfred Errera